This is a list of notable individuals who have been, or are involved with the Royal Military College of Canada.

Many RMC alumni have served Canada in war and peace. Billy Bishop was a leading ace of the First World War, won the Victoria Cross and helped to create the Canadian Flying Corps. Charles Merritt was a lawyer and militia officer who won the Victoria Cross at Dieppe during the Second World War. Leonard Birchall, the "Saviour of Ceylon", discovered the approach of the Japanese fleet during the Second World War and showed courage and leadership as a prisoner of war in Japan. Ex-cadets also helped with the peace process. John de Chastelain was twice Chief of Defence Staff and helped to monitor the Peace Accords in Northern Ireland. Romeo Dallaire headed the United Nation forces in Rwanda. Many former cadets gave their lives during both world wars, and in Afghanistan.

Many RMC alumni have had careers in the public or private sectors. Marc Garneau was the first Canadian in space and now is a Member of Parliament. Chris Hadfield became a test pilot, astronaut, the first Canadian to walk in space and the first Canadian commander of the International Space Station. Jack Granatstein became a historian and headed the Canadian War Museum.

Old-eighteen

The term "Old Eighteen" refers to the first class of cadets accepted into the Royal Military College of Canada.

Quotations

Alumni who were knighted
During the Convocation Ceremony on Wednesday 14 May, H24263 Dr. John S. Cowan said to the Class of 2008 "Of the first 170 cadets who entered RMC from 1876 to 1883 eight received knightships for feats of leadership in many fields of endeavor on at least four continents." After 1919 [ by a Canadian decision] Canadian were no longer eligible for knighthood. Those ex-cadets serving in the British forces were not under any such restriction and so we have the later appointments.

Notable graduates
Royal Military College of Canada is prestigious and has had many notable alumni (Shown with college numbers).

Notable honorary degree recipients

Notable honorary and special members of the Royal Military College of Canada Club 
Shown with college numbers.

Notable non-graduate alumni of the RMC

Notable professors/educators/staff 
Shown with college numbers.

Commandants 
Shown with college numbers.  Ranks indicative of rank while serving as Commandant.

 The Commandant of the Royal Military College of Canada is appointed ex officio as honorary Aide-de-Camp to the Governor General of Canada

RMC Club presidents

Principals / Director of Studies

First 32 female cadets to enter college in 1980
Shown with college numbers.

Wall of Honour

Rhodes Scholars
As of 2011 there have been 13 Rhodes Scholars who were ex-cadets of RMC:
2565 Adrian A.W. Duguid (RMC 1937) Rhodes Scholar 1946 Deceased 14 January 1968;
4393 Doctor Desmond Morton (CMR RMC 1959) Rhodes Scholar 1959;
5417 Colonel (ret) WK Megill (CMR RMC 1962) Rhodes Scholar 1962;
6219 Doctor Robin Boadway (RRMC / RMC 1964) Rhodes Scholar 1964;
6182 Doctor RB Harrison (RMC 1964) Rhodes Scholar 1964;
6508 MGen (ret) John L Adams CMM CD (RMC 1965) Rhodes Scholar 1965;
7291 Doctor T.A.J. Keefer (RMC 1967) Rhodes Scholar 1967;
10419 Captain (N) (ret) David V Jacobson (CMR RMC 1975) Rhodes Scholar 1975;
10941 Doctor Grant M Gibbs (RMC 1976) Rhodes Scholar 1976;
15040 Mr Paul E Stanborough (RMC 1985) Rhodes Scholar 1985;
15595 LCol (ret) WDE (Billy) Allan CD (RRMC RMC 1986) Rhodes Scholar 1987;
23988 Mr Gino Bruni (RMC 2008) Rhodes Scholar 2010; Prairies & Jesus College, reading Jurisprudence
24862 2Lt Brendan Alexander (RMC 2011) Rhodes Scholar 2011, New College, Oxford to read International Relations.

Books
14390 Kate Armstrong, (RMC 1984), author of her memoir, The Stone Frigate: The Royal Military College's First Female Cadet Speaks Out
Walter S. Avis: Essays and articles selected from a quarter century of scholarship at the Royal Military College of Canada, Kingston (Occasional papers of the Department of English, R.M.C.) 1978
2141 Thomas T. L. Brock (RMC 1930) Fight the good fight: Looking in on the recruit class at the Royal Military College of Canada during a week in February 1931. 1964
19828 John-James Ford, (RMC 1995), author of Bonk on the head, a description, in novel form, of a fictional officer-cadet's life at RMC
G1397 Doctor Andrew A.B. Godefroy Professional training put to the test: the Royal Military College of Canada and Army Leadership in the South African War 1899–1902 The Army Doctrine and Training Bulletin 2005
6647 Major (Ret) Mitchell Kryzanowski (RMC 1965), wrote Currie Hall: Memorial to the Canadian Corps (Kingston: Hewson and White, 1989), a description of the decoration of Currie Hall
S125 Major (Ret) William WJ Oliver, and S134 Mrs Rolande Oliver, RMC Hockey History Digest Eds.  Red & White Books, Kingston, 2003
4237 Dr. Adrian Preston & Peter Dennis (Edited) Swords and Covenants Rowman And Littlefield, London. Croom Helm. 1976.
H16511 Dr. Richard Arthur Preston To Serve Canada: A History of the Royal Military College of Canada 1997 Toronto, University of Toronto Press, 1969.
H16511 Dr. Richard Arthur Preston Canada's RMC – A History of Royal Military College Second Edition 1982
H16511 Dr. Richard Preston R.M.C. and Kingston: The effect of imperial and military influences on a Canadian community. 1968
H1877 R. Guy C. Smith (editor) As You Were! Ex-Cadets Remember. In 2 Volumes. Volume I: 1876–1918. Volume II: 1919–1984. Royal Military College. [Kingston]. The R.M.C. Club of Canada. 1984
A.G.G. Wurtele Not in Cooke. – Account of a tour by the first graduating class of the Royal Military College, Kingston, 1880.
Richard A. Preston To Serve Canada: A History of the Royal Military College since the Second World War, Ottawa, University of Ottawa Press, 1991.
4669 Toivo Roht, (CMR RMC 1960) Collège militaire royal de Saint-Jean, Royal Roads Military College and Royal Military College 1955–2006 2007
RMC Cadet Handbook Kingston: RMC, 2004
Royal Military College of Canada: The Canadian Services Colleges 1962
The Royal Military College of Canada 1876 to 1919
Directory of Ex-Cadets, Royal Military College Club of Canada (RMC Club, Kingston, 1992) The book us a directory of students from Royal Military College of Canada (Kingston), Royal Roads Military College (Victoria), and College Militaire Royal de Saint-Jean (Saint-Jean-sur-Richelieu).

See also
 List of Royal Military College of Canada Memorials

References

Royal Military College of Canada
Royal Military College of Canada
Royal Military College